Joseph H. Howey (September 1, 1901 – March 23, 1973) was a physicist and academic administrator at the Georgia Institute of Technology. He was the director of Georgia Tech's School of Physics for 28 years, from 1935 to 1963.

Early life
Howey received a Bachelor of Arts from the College of Wooster in 1923, and a PhD from Yale University in 1930. Howey was also a physicist in Firestone Tire and Rubber Corp's research laboratory from 1929 to 1931, after which he returned to Yale as an instructor.

Georgia Tech
In 1934, Howey became a professor of physics at Georgia Tech, and in 1935 he became the director of the school's physics department, where he was instrumental in establishing a standard curriculum and creating graduate and PhD programs. In 1963, Howey requested to be "associate director" so that he could focus on the design of the new physics building, and was succeeded in his post by Vernon D. Crawford.

Three years after his death, on September 17, 1976, the physics building he helped design was dedicated and named in his honor.

References

1901 births
1973 deaths
20th-century American physicists
College of Wooster alumni
Yale University alumni
Georgia Tech faculty